Alejandra Méndez Salorio (born 12 June 1982) is a Mexican politician affiliated with the Ecologist Green Party of Mexico. As of 2014 she served as Deputy of the LIX Legislature of the Mexican Congress as a plurinominal representative.

References

1982 births
Living people
Politicians from Mexico City
Women members of the Chamber of Deputies (Mexico)
Members of the Chamber of Deputies (Mexico)
Ecologist Green Party of Mexico politicians
21st-century Mexican politicians
21st-century Mexican women politicians
Universidad Iberoamericana alumni
Deputies of the LIX Legislature of Mexico